= Rainapur =

Coordinates: 15°58′N 75°02′E

- Village
- Interactive map of Rainapur
- Country: India
- State: Karnataka
- District: Belgaum

Languages
  - Official: Kannada
- Time zone: UTC+5:30 (IST)

Rainapur is a village in Belgaum district of Karnataka, India.
